George C. Cory Jr. (August 3, 1920 – April 11, 1978) was an American pianist and composer whose most notable work was the music to the song "I Left My Heart in San Francisco". His partner, Douglass Cross, wrote the lyrics. When the song was written in 1953, Cory and Cross were amateur songwriters who had moved to New York following military service during World War II and had become homesick for the West Coast.  After pitching the song unsuccessfully to other artists for about eight years, the song was picked up by Ralph Sharon, Tony Bennett's musical director, who suggested to Bennett that it would be a good song for a 1962 "Happy New Year" engagement scheduled at the Fairmont Hotel in San Francisco. Mayor George Christopher and future mayor Joseph L. Alioto were in attendance. After a good response to the song, Bennett recorded it shortly thereafter and released it in February 1962. The song became an enduring hit and in 1969 was named as the official song of San Francisco. The two authors were present at the meeting when the city's board of governors selected it by a unanimous decision.

Early career

Cory grew up in the San Francisco area and attended Old Mill School in Mill Valley. He attended Tamalpais High, class of 1937. He studied music at UC Berkeley, then enlisted in the army on September 14, 1942. While in the army, he met Douglass Cross who was also in the service at the time. Cross had been a baritone soloist (and youngest member) of the San Francisco Opera Company in 1941 when his career was interrupted by the war. During the war, Cory and Cross collaborated on musical shows for servicemen. After military service, the two moved to Brooklyn, New York, to make a career of songwriting and met with mixed success. They wrote over 200 songs together, but only 30 were published. The song, "I Left My Heart in San Francisco" was their only commercial success. The song provided them income for life when it became an international hit. In 2003, authors Cory and Cross received the "Towering Song Award" for the song, given by the Songwriters Hall of Fame and presented at the National Academy of Popular Music's 34th annual induction ceremony. Tony Bennett received the "Towering Performance Award" for his trademark rendition of the song.

Later life
Cory died in his San Francisco apartment on April 11, 1978. He had been despondent in previous weeks over failing health, according to the coroner's office. He was 57.

References

Further reading
 Christine, Bill (2017). They Left Their Hearts in San Francisco : The Lives of Songwriters George Cory and Douglass Cross. Jefferson, NC: McFarland & Company. .

1920 births
1978 suicides
Composers from San Francisco
20th-century American pianists
20th-century American composers
Tamalpais High School alumni
American male pianists
20th-century American male musicians
Drug-related suicides in California
United States Army personnel of World War II